The Slutsk uprising or the Slutsk defence was an unsuccessful armed attempt to establish an independent Belarus. It took place in late 1920, near the end of the Polish-Soviet War, in the region of the town of Slutsk. It involved a series of clashes between irregular Belarusian forces loyal to the Belarusian People's Republic and the Soviet Red Army, ending in a Soviet victory.

Prelude

Peace of Riga

The preliminary peace accord (later finalized in Peace of Riga), signed on October 12, 1920, set new borders between Poland and the Soviet republics that divided modern Belarus and Ukraine in two parts. No Belarusian delegation was invited to the Riga congress — neither from the Belarusian Democratic Republic nor from the puppet Socialist Soviet Republic of Byelorussia.

Due to the treaty, the demarcation line Kiyevichy-Lan lay in a way that the region of Slutsk, Belarus, stayed in a neutral zone for some time before being taken by the Red Army.

National movement in Slutsk 
The basis of the Slutsk defence was the local peasantry fighting against the Bolshevist agrarian policy of War communism and supporting the independence of Belarus declared on March 25, 1918. Leaders of the defence were local intellectuals and szlachta.

Slutsk was an important centre of Belarusian national life. Local intellectuals kept tense contacts with groups supporting the Belarusian Democratic Republic in other regions.

In 1918 a Belarusian National Committee led by Paval Zhauryd was created in the town.

Soviet–Polish War and Slutsk

During the Polish-Soviet War of 1919–1920, the region of Slutsk was occupied several times by Polish and Soviet troops. Finally, on 11 October 1920, the Polish took control of the town.

The news about the division of Belarus between Poland and the Bolsheviks provoked indignation in Belarusian society. Immediately after the Polish reoccupation of the town the Belarusian National Committee recommenced its activity and started forming Belarusian self-defence units. First, a 500-man Belarusian militia corps was created.

The Polish military was preparing to withdraw to Polish territory and did not prevent the creation of Belarusian military units. Many Polish military consisted of Belarusians and sympathised with the self-defence activities.

Still, there was no unity among Belarusian activists as to how to further strategy. There was a fraction that advocated cooperation with Poland. On the other side, there were even proposals for cooperation with the Soviets. Because of these contradictions, much time needed for military preparation was lost. Lack of solidarity had its negative effect during the whole military defence action.

Only in November 1920, the withdrawing Polish military authorities transferred the civil power to the Belarusian National Committee. In all local communities and villages, democratic elections took place; new elected Committees replaced the previous Polish-appointed local administration.

Local representatives of Belarusian socialist revolutionaries, who were the main advocates of the idea of Belarusian independence, decided to call up a Congress to confirm the authority of the Belarusian Republic in the region. Delegates from all local communities (five from each) and Belarusian organisations (one from each) were invited.

Congress of Słuččyna
On 14 November 1920, the Congress of Słuččyna (Slutsk region) started its work. There were 107 delegates from Słuck and its surroundings as well as several representatives of the Belarusian army of general Bułak-Bałachowicz.

The government of the Belarusian National Republic appointed Pavał Žaŭryd its commissioner to Słuččyna.

Congress passed a resolution declaring the authority of the government of the Belarusian National Republic and protesting against the Soviet invasion of Belarus. A decision was made to organize armed resistance against the Bolshevik occupation:

Military preparations
A Rada of Słuččyna consisting of 17 people was elected with the chairman Uładzimier Prakulevič. Its function was to organise civil governance of Słuččyna before regular elections could be held as well as to organise a military defence.

The military command was given to a troika led by Pavał Žaŭryd. The Rada declared a general mobilisation and continued creation of military units.

The mobilisation was very successful among inhabitants of Słuččyna, in the villages of Cimkavičy, Kapyl, Siemiežava, Hrozava and surroundings. Soon there were c. 10,000 men mobilised into the newly created forces.

Two regiments were formed by the Rada: 1st Słuck regiment under Lieutenant Colonel Achrem Haŭryłovič and the 2nd Hrozaŭ regiment under Captain Siemianiuk. These two regiments formed the Słuck brigade under Anton Sokał-Kutyłoŭski. The military headquarters was transferred from Słuck to Siemiežava because of approaching Bolshevik armies.

The military defence action was actively supported by Belarusian nationalists from different regions of Belarus at that time occupied by Polish troops.

From Hrodna a banner with the Pahonia and the motto "To those who went to die for the life of their Fatherland" was sent to Słuck. The military commission of the Government of the Belarusian People's Republic that was acting as Belarus' defence ministry, sent several military specialists to help to organise the defence. Soon a well-organised military hospital and military court were created by the Slutsk brigade.

The Słuck Rada had tight contacts with the army of Stanisław Bułak-Bałachowicz and planned to coordinate with it.

On 21 November 1920, the Rada of Słuččyna made a new declaration:

The Rada gave the order to all military units and volunteers to group near Siemiežava on November 24. A demonstration took place in the central square of Słuck.

The battles
On November 27 the first encounters between Belarusian and Soviet forces began.

The Słuck brigade made some successful attacks near Kapyl, Cimkavičy and Vyzna. Against the Belarusian forces fought the Omsk division of the Red Army. Despite some support from the local population, the Belarusian units lacked ammunition and arms.

There were fights near the villages Bystrycy, Vasilčycy, Vierabiejčycy, Daškava, Vasilishki, Lutavičy, Mackievičy, Sadovičy and Morač. The Słuck brigade managed to occupy several villages.

This started an anti-Bolshevik partisan movement. As people joined them, the Slutsk Rada appealed to Red Army soldiers to stop resistance as well. Many of them did, as numerous Russian peasants were opposing the Soviet agrarian policy among them. Therefore, the Bolsheviks had to bring in units consisting of Latvians and Chinese to combat the Belarusian units.

Still, the powers were unequal and on December 31 the Słuck brigade had to retreat to Polish territory where it was disarmed by Polish border guards.

Some of the defendants of Słuck later returned to Belarus but were captured by the Bolsheviks and repressed. Some of the Belarusian militaries stayed in the region as a partisan Green Army and continued armed resistance against Soviet rule until the 1930s.

Modern reflections of the Slutsk military defence

During Perestroika, numerous political groups dedicated themselves to publicise a movement that was virtually erased from history during the Soviet time. November 27 became a holiday that groups like the Belarusian Popular Front and some intellectuals celebrate as Heroes Day. However, Belarusian officials under president Alexander Lukashenko do not recognise the Słuck military defence as significant, mostly due to the pro-Soviet official state ideology dominating in Belarus.

In 1948, a monument in honor of Słuck rebels was placed by Belarusian emigrants near Mittenwald, a German city near the Alps.

References

External links

Slutsk  on Belarusguide.com
Zianon Paźniak: The Slutsk defence action is a glorious example for us 
Article 

Belarusian National Republic
Belarusian independence movement
Rebellions in Belarus
1920 in Belarus
Russian Civil War
Polish–Soviet War
Slutsk